Body of Water is a indie-rock musical created by Tony Kienitz and Tanna Herr with music by Jim Walker. It entails the life of fourteen teens left behind in a civil war crisis, awaiting further signals from their parents while hiding in a secluded mountain cabin. The show was the inaugural production of A Theatre Near U, a theatre and film academy for teenagers in the San Francisco Bay Area.

Premise 
A group of teenagers meet at a secluded cabin in the woods; their parents, who are now missing had instructed them to go there to hide from ideological extremists. The teens decide they will wait for the adults to arrive, but as times goes on they slowly realize that their parents may never arrive.

Cast

Music and cast album
The show was adapted from music written by Jim Walker, and the cast album of the show was digitally released on October 12, 2014. The music for the show was nominated for Best Original Music by the San Francisco Bay Area Critics Circle Excellence in Theatre Awards. 

 Mummy and Daddy (Instrumental) - Band
 We Know Who You Are - Company
 Human - CJ and Jennifer
 Liberace's Grave (Ring Ring Ring) - Buster and Company
 This Is the Life - Henry, Alice, and Emily
 One of My Dreams - Jennifer
 All Fall Down - Shorty and Company
 Jobs - Company

 Rachel - Bosh
 All Up to You - Charlie and Company
 Alibis - Company
 Love Coming Through - Vienna and Company
 North Beach Tuesday - Cole and Company
 Steamline - Willa and Company
 Poor Baby - Company
 Mummy and Daddy - Bonus Track on Cast Album Performed by Jim Walker

Awards

Reception
The overall reception of Body of Water was positive. Charles Jarrett of the Rossmoor News raved of "the brilliant and cacophonic mixture of words, music, and social madness" that evolved into an "absolutely captivating, terrifying sequence of events that keep you on the edge of your seat." He also praised the music by Jim Walker as "wonderfully raw, cryptic, and thought-evoking" as well as the "exciting dance choreography" by Kaylie Caires.

Richard Conema of Talkin' Broadway agreed with Jarrett on the music and choreography. "The music by Portland and Hollywood composer Jim Walker is rich and evocative and the dances by San Diego choreographer Kaylie Caires are tornado driven, sometimes reminiscent of the work of the Alvin Ailey and Paul Taylor dance companies." He also said that the young actors of the show "are the adult performers of the future and some could very well be stars."

Harry Duke of For All Events praised the young actors as well, saying that they each created a "distinctive character and their individual work is key to accepting the totality of their situation. These young people are doing serious work and many aspire to be professional actors." He also commended producing theatre company A Theatre Near U, saying that "A Theatre Near U may have just fired the first shot in a revolution to determine the future of Youth Theatre."

References

2014 musicals
Original musicals
Rock musicals
Teen musicals